The El Paso Marathon is an annual running event held in El Paso, Texas since 2007. It is an official Boston Marathon qualifier and includes a Half Marathon as well as a 5K race. It is organized by the non-profit El Paso Marathon Foundation.  Over 3,000 runners participated in the 2019 Marathon, Half Marathon and 5K.

Course

When founded, the Full Marathon was a point to point race, which started at the top of Transmountain Road and ended at Union Plaza in Downtown El Paso. Elevation loss from start to finish is 1584 ft.   A new course debuted in 2018 which starts and ends downtown at Southwest University Park.

The Half Marathon and 5K race start and finish on Anthony St. in front of Union Plaza Park.

Marathon Winners

The following is the list of marathon winners over the years:

References

External links
Official Website

Marathons in the United States
El Paso, Texas
Annual sporting events in the United States
Recurring sporting events established in 2007